is a Japanese footballer currently playing as a defender for YSCC Yokohama.

Career statistics

Club
.

Notes

References

External links

1996 births
Living people
Association football people from Tokyo
Kokushikan University alumni
Japanese footballers
Association football defenders
J3 League players
Tokyo Musashino United FC players
FC Ryukyu players
YSCC Yokohama players